Reto Rossetti (11 April 1909 – 20 September 1994) was a poet and an Esperantist professor. He was Italian-Swiss and retained his nationality, although he lived all his life in Britain.  His professional career as a teacher in art colleges culminated as Head of the art education department at Bristol university. His elder brother was Cezaro Rossetti, author of Kredu min, sinjorino! (Believe me, Ma'am!). He died at Gosport.

Creative life 

His poetry appeared in the compendious work, Kvaropo (Foursome).  Poems by Rossetti used to appear in the Esperanto (newspaper) press.

With his brother, Cezaro Rossetti (Caesar) he wrote and illustrated 'The Moc Gonnogal' – a collection of poems written as a spoof on the work of the Scottish poet William McGonnogal.

His other works are: Mestizo de l' Mondo (Mestizo of the World), a collection of poems; El la Maniko (Out of my Sleeve); and Pinta krajono (Sharp Pencil), a collection of novellas.  His main translation is Otelo (Othello) by Shakespeare.  Rossetti did many translations from English poetry.  He was the editor and main collaborator on the Angla Antologio.

Three of his works are on William Auld's Basic Esperanto Reading List:
El la maniko, 33 Rakontoj, Pinta krajono.

Works

Original in Esperanto 

Oazo  (poetry collection in Kvaropo (1952))
Mestizo de l' Mondo
El la maniko (a collection of novellas, 1955)
Pinta krajono (a collection of poems, 1959)

Translations 

Otelo

Edited publications 

33 Rakontoj, La Esperanta novelaro with Ferenc Szilágyi
Angla Antologio with William Auld

Sources 

The first version of this article is a translation from the corresponding article in the Esperanto Wikipedia.

External links
(in Esperanto) Short biography.
(in Esperanto) Sperto saĝon akrigas. A review of the Rossetti brothers by Baldur Ragnarsson, originally published in Juna Amiko.

1909 births
1994 deaths
British Esperantists
Writers of Esperanto literature
Translators to Esperanto
20th-century translators
Swiss emigrants to the United Kingdom